An ice house, or icehouse, is a building used to store ice throughout the year, commonly used prior to the invention of the refrigerator. Some were underground chambers, usually man-made, close to natural sources of winter ice such as freshwater lakes, but many were buildings with various types of insulation.

During the winter, ice and snow would be cut from lakes or rivers, taken into the ice house, and packed with insulation (often straw or sawdust). It would remain frozen for many months, often until the following winter, and could be used as a source of ice during the summer months. The main application of the ice was the storage of foods, but it could also be used simply to cool drinks, or in the preparation of ice-cream and sorbet desserts.

History
A cuneiform tablet from c. 1780 BC records the construction of an icehouse by Zimri-Lim, the King of Mari, in the northern Mesopotamian town of Terqa, "which never before had any king built." In China, archaeologists have found remains of ice pits from the 7th century BC, and references suggest that these were in use before 1100 BC. Alexander the Great stored snow in pits dug for that purpose around 300 BC. In Rome, in the 3rd century AD, snow was imported from the mountains, stored in straw-covered pits, and sold from snow shops. The ice that formed in the bottom of the pits sold at a higher price than the snow on top.

Persia

By 400 BCE, Persian engineers were building yakhchāls in the desert. The structure used evaporative cooling (and diurnal heat reservoir) techniques to store ice and sometimes food. Water was often channeled from a qanat to a yakhchāl, where it freezes when the temperature was low enough.

The structure has a dome shape above ground with a subterranean storage space and uses a trench to catch what water does melt from the ice to allow it to refreeze during the cold desert nights. Many that were built centuries ago remain standing.

Modern times

United Kingdom 
The ice house was introduced to Britain in the 1600s.  James I commissioned the first modern ice house in 1619 in Greenwich Park and another in Hampton Court in 1625-6. The Hampton Court ice house (or snow conserve) was a brick-lined well, which was 30 feet deep (9.1 metres) and 16 feet (4.8 metres) wide. A timber building with a thatched roof covered it. In 1660 Charles II had one built in London's upper St James's Park (now Green Park).

Various types and designs of ice house exist but British ice houses were commonly brick-lined, domed structures, with most of their volume underground. Ice houses varied in design depending on the date and builder, but were usually conical or rounded at the bottom to hold melted ice. They usually had a drain to take away the melt-water. It is recorded that the idea for ice houses was brought to Britain by travellers who had seen similar arrangements in Italy, where peasants collected ice from the mountains and used it to keep food fresh inside caves. Ice houses were also known as ice wells, ice pits or ice mounds. Game larders and venison larders were sometimes marked on Ordnance Survey maps as ice houses. Bruce Walker, an expert on Scottish Vernacular buildings, has suggested that relatively numerous and usually long-ruined ice houses on country estates have led to Scotland's many legends of secret tunnels.

During the 18th century there was an increase in the construction of ice houses often at large manor houses and their estates.

Ice was often imported into the UK from Scandinavia until the 1920s, although from around 1900 the import of ice declined sharply owing to the development of factories in the UK where ice was made artificially. Usually, only large mansions had purpose-built buildings to store ice. Many examples of ice houses exist in the UK, some of which have fallen into disrepair.

Good examples of 19th-century ice houses can be found at Ashton Court, Bristol, Albrighton, Bridgnorth, Aynhoe Park, Northamptonshire, Deddington Manor, Grendon, Warwickshire, and at Christchurch Mansion, Ipswich, Suffolk, Petworth House, Sussex, Danny House, Sussex, Ayscoughfee Hall, Spalding, Rufford Abbey, Eglinton Country Park in Scotland, Parlington Hall in Yorkshire and Croxteth Hall Liverpool, Burghley House, Stamford and Moggerhanger Park, Moggerhanger, Bedfordshire. An unusual example of an ice house that was converted from a redundant brick springhead can be found in the former grounds of Norton House, Midsomer Norton, Somerset. The largest surviving ice house in the UK is the Tugnet Ice House in Spey Bay. It was built in 1830, and used to store ice for packing salmon caught in the River Spey before transportation to market in London.

During the Second World War (between 1939 and 1945) old ice houses found new uses. Although some were used to store ice and food others, because they were often underground and well-built, became air raid shelters.

In 2018, the very large Park Crescent West ice well was discovered in Park Crescent, London. It was created for Samuel Dash in the early 1780s for commercial use before the building of the John Nash crescent was begun in 1806. Originally used for the storage of local ice taken from the River Thames in the winter months, it was taken over in the 1820s by the ice merchant William Leftwich, who used it for storing imported ice from the frozen lakes of Norway.

A pair of commercial ice wells has been preserved in London, beneath what is now the London Canal Museum at King's Cross. They are around 30 feet in diameter and were originally 42 feet deep. They were built in 1857 and 1863 by the Swiss entrepreneur Carlo Gatti.

Republic of Ireland 
In 1985, a passage was discovered beneath Ardgillan Castle in Co. Dublin, Republic of Ireland. This passage was found to be the ice house that had been known to exist on the grounds, but whose location had not been rediscovered until this date. There are other ice houses still surviving in Ireland, for example on the Woodstock Estate near Inistioge, Co. Kilkenny.

United States

Ice houses allowed a trade in ice that was a major part of the early economy of the New England region of the United States, which saw fortunes made by people who transported ice in straw-packed ships to the southern states and throughout the Caribbean Sea. Most notable was Frederic Tudor (known as Boston's "Ice King") who formed the Tudor Ice Company in the early 19th century. In winter months, ice was chipped from a lake surface and often dragged by sled to the ice house. In summer months, icemen delivered it to residences in ice-wagons; the ice would then be stored in an icebox, which was used much like a modern refrigerator.

As home and business refrigeration became more commonplace, ice houses fell into disuse, and the home ice delivery business declined until it had virtually disappeared by the late 1960s. Smaller ice houses, often no more than a sawdust pile covered by a makeshift roof or tarpaulin, continued to be maintained for storing ice for use in local events such as fairs. Today, most ice for daily consumption is made in a home freezer, while bulk ice is manufactured, distributed and sold like other retail commodities.  At least one icehouse is still operated traditionally, as a tourist attraction on New England campsite.

Texas and the American South 
In Texas, former ice houses are a cultural tradition. Ice merchants diversified to sell groceries and cold beer, serving as early convenience stores and local gathering places. The widespread 7-Eleven chain of convenience stores in the U.S., first known as U-Tote'm Stores, developed from ice houses operated by ice manufacturers, like the Southland Ice Manufacturing Company, in Houston, Dallas, and San Antonio in the 1930s. Southland was not the only company in the Southern United States to develop a convenience-store corporation from an ice business. Munford Inc. of Atlanta began in the early 20th century by vending both ice and coal from mule-drawn wagons, as the Atlantic Ice and Coal Company. By the 1970s, Munford, Inc. was operating a large chain of convenience stores with the name Majik Market (the company was sold in 1988 and filed Chapter 11 bankruptcy in 1990).

In some parts of Texas, especially from San Antonio and the Texas Hill Country down to the Mexican border, ice houses functioned as open-air bars, with the word "icehouse" becoming a colloquialism for an establishment that derives the majority of its income from the sale of cold beer. The distinction between South Texas ice houses and ice houses of other parts of the state and the South has been connected to the Catholicism of the region, a deeper-rooted Mexican culture, and the influence of German immigrants.

See also

 Deep water source cooling
 Ice cutting
 Ice pond
 Seasonal thermal energy storage (STES)
 Thermal energy storage

References

Further reading

External links 

 Map of ice houses along the Kennebec River, 1891, Maine Memory Network, Maine, U.S.

Ice trade
Cooling technology
Indigenous architecture
House types
Warehouses
Vernacular architecture